Macropoliana scheveni is a moth of the  family Sphingidae. It is known from Tanzania.

References

Endemic fauna of Tanzania
Macropoliana
Moths described in 1972
Insects of Tanzania
Moths of Africa